Chateau Benares is an album by Sanjay Mishra, released in 2006.

Critical reception
In The Washington Post, Mike Joyce wrote, "Thanks in no small part to Blue Incantation, a highly regarded collaboration with fellow guitarist Jerry Garcia released in 1995, Sanjay Mishra has developed a reputation for creating imaginative, cross-cultural soundscapes. Chateau Benares, in which East again coalesces with West in ways that sometimes border on the hypnotic, follows suit.... Whatever the album's commercial fate, Mishra's artistry and vision certainly deserve the exposure."

Track listing 
All music composed and arranged by Sanjay Mishra, except "Oriental", composed by Enrique Granados (arranged by Mishra for classical and fretless guitar)
"A Different Morning" – 4:58
"Loop 4" – 6:36
"The Gateless Gate" – 6:24
"Logical Journey" – 4:45
"The Lady with the Flowers" – 1:39
"Since Then" – 2:18
"Oriental" – 5:01
"The Bells of Heaven Ring" – 6:23
"Raindrum" – 3:32
"Mirror" – 3:54
"Loop 4 Alternate" – 5:39
"Oslo" – 2:15

Personnel 
Musicians
Sanjay Mishra – MIDI nylon string electric guitar
DJ Logic – turntables
Keller Williams – guitar, electric bass
Steve Gorn – bamboo flute
Barun Pal – slide guitar
Samir Chatterjee – tabla
Miti – additional programming: mix, guitar, and bass
Production
Sanjay Mishra – producer, mixing, mastering
Brad Taishoff – executive producer

References 

2006 albums
Sanjay Mishra albums